Electricite du Laos Football Club (Laos ສະໂມສອນໄຟຟ້າລາວ) is a professional football club based in Laos. They play in the top national football league in Laos, and finished ninth in the Lao Premier League. Their home stadium is Lanexang Stadium.

Players

External links
Official Facebook

Football clubs in Laos
Association football clubs established in 2015
2015 establishments in Laos